Achu is a name. Notable people with the name include:

 Achu Rajamani, Indian film score and soundtrack composer and singer
 Naomi Achu, Cameroonian singer, rapper, and songwriter
 Simon Achidi Achu (1934–2021), Cameroonian politician; Prime Minister of Cameroon from 1992 to 1996